"Hello, Hello, I'm Back Again" is a song by English glam rock singer Gary Glitter, written by Glitter with Mike Leander and produced by Mike Leander. The title of the song is only sung twice and as a result other more frequent sung lines have become alternative titles, these include "It's Good to Be Back" and "Did You Miss Me?". Sometimes the title is shortened to simply "Hello, Hello".

Background
The song is about a man calling his lover after being away for some time and begins with "Did you miss me (yeah), while I was away?", with "Hello, hello, it's good to be back... Good to be back" sung repeatedly in the chorus. It peaked at No. 2 on the UK Singles Chart and charted in several other countries and remained a popular oldie for decades. It was also often sung at football matches, with the lyrics "Hello, hello" (insert team name) "are back". The song has been featured on a number of Glitter compilation and live albums since, as well as his second studio album, Touch Me (1973). In 1995 the song returned to the UK charts when Glitter re-recorded it, under the title "Hello, Hello, I'm Back Again (Again!)".

The Young Gods cover

Swiss post-industrial band the Young Gods covered the song for their eponymous 1987 debut album The Young Gods under the title "Did You Miss Me?" and released it as a single in the same year.

Track listing
"Did You Miss Me? Hello, Hello I'm Back Again!" – 3:22
"The Irrtum Boys" – 2:41

Chart performance

Certifications

References

External links
 

1973 singles
Gary Glitter songs
1988 singles
The Young Gods songs
Songs written by Mike Leander
Songs written by Gary Glitter
1973 songs
Bell Records singles